The 1942 Philadelphia Phillies season was the 60th season in the history of the franchise. The team, managed by Hans Lobert, began their fifth season at Shibe Park. Prior to the season, the team shortened the team nickname to 'Phils'. Of the change, a baseball writer opined prior to the season, "the gag is they wanted to get the 'lie' out of their name."

Regular season

Season standings

Record vs. opponents

Game log 

|- style="background:#fbb"
| 1 || April 14 || Braves || 1–2 || Al Javery (1–0) || Si Johnson (0–1) || None || 10,150 || 0–1
|- style="background:#fbb"
| 2 || April 15 || Braves || 2–6 || Jim Tobin (1–0) || Cy Blanton (0–1) || None || 2,052 || 0–2
|- style="background:#fbb"
| 3 || April 16 || Braves || 1–2 (10) || Tom Earley (1–0) || Tommy Hughes (0–1) || None || 1,500 || 0–3
|- style="background:#fbb"
| 4 || April 17 || @ Dodgers || 1–7 || Johnny Allen (1–0) || Lefty Hoerst (0–1) || None || 15,430 || 0–4
|- style="background:#bfb"
| 5 || April 18 || @ Dodgers || 2–1 || Rube Melton (1–0) || Hugh Casey (0–1) || None || 11,611 || 1–4
|- style="background:#fbb"
| 6 || April 19 || @ Dodgers || 2–6 || Curt Davis (2–0) || Cy Blanton (0–2) || None || 15,576 || 1–5
|- style="background:#bfb"
| 7 || April 20 || @ Giants || 6–3 || Si Johnson (1–1) || Bill McGee (1–1) || None || 1,393 || 2–5
|- style="background:#bbb"
| – || April 21 || @ Giants || colspan=6 | Postponed (inclement weather); Makeup: August 15 as a traditional double-header
|- style="background:#fbb"
| 8 || April 22 || Giants || 0–3 || Dave Koslo (1–1) || Tommy Hughes (0–2) || None || 2,000 || 2–6
|- style="background:#fbb"
| 9 || April 23 || Giants || 2–5 || Hal Schumacher (1–1) || Johnny Podgajny (0–1) || Ace Adams (1) || 2,000 || 2–7
|- style="background:#bfb"
| 10 || April 24 || Dodgers || 4–2 || Lefty Hoerst (1–1) || Kirby Higbe (1–2) || None || 1,893 || 3–7
|- style="background:#fbb"
| 11 || April 25 || Dodgers || 1–4 || Johnny Allen (2–0) || Rube Melton (1–1) || None || 1,505 || 3–8
|- style="background:#fbb"
| 12 || April 26 (1) || Dodgers || 1–3 || Curt Davis (3–0) || Ike Pearson (0–1) || None || see 2nd game || 3–9
|- style="background:#fbb"
| 13 || April 26 (2) || Dodgers || 2–10 || Ed Head (3–0) || Tommy Hughes (0–3) || None || 21,766 || 3–10
|- style="background:#fbb"
| 14 || April 28 || @ Pirates || 1–7 || Max Butcher (2–1) || Earl Naylor (0–1) || None || 1,752 || 3–11
|- style="background:#fbb"
| 15 || April 29 || @ Pirates || 6–7 (10) || Rip Sewell (3–0) || Cy Blanton (0–3) || None || 1,567 || 3–12
|- style="background:#bfb"
| 16 || April 30 || @ Pirates || 6–3 || Lefty Hoerst (2–1) || Johnny Lanning (0–2) || None || 1,826 || 4–12
|-

|- style="background:#fbb"
| 17 || May 1 || @ Reds || 5–6 || Elmer Riddle (1–3) || Johnny Podgajny (0–2) || None || 805 || 4–13
|- style="background:#fbb"
| 18 || May 2 || @ Reds || 3–4 ||  || Cy Blanton (0–4) || None || 2,013 || 4–14
|- style="background:#fbb"
| 19 || May 3 (1) || @ Cubs || 1–9 || Bill Lee (3–1) || Tommy Hughes (0–4) || None || see 2nd game || 4–15
|- style="background:#bfb"
| 20 || May 3 (2) || @ Cubs || 8–1 || Rube Melton (2–1) || Hi Bithorn (0–2) || None || 19,980 || 5–15
|- style="background:#bfb"
| 21 || May 5 || @ Cubs || 4–2 || Johnny Podgajny (1–2) || Claude Passeau (2–3) || None || 2,161 || 6–15
|- style="background:#fbb"
| 22 || May 6 || @ Cardinals || 2–11 || Mort Cooper (2–2) || Si Johnson (1–2) || None || 789 || 6–16
|- style="background:#bbb"
| – || May 7 || @ Cardinals || colspan=6 | Postponed (inclement weather); Makeup: June 13 as a traditional double-header
|- style="background:#fbb"
| 23 || May 9 || @ Braves || 2–6 || Jim Tobin (4–3) || Lefty Hoerst (2–2) || None || 3,828 || 6–17
|- style="background:#fbb"
| 24 || May 10 (1) || @ Braves || 1–5 || Al Javery (2–2) || Rube Melton (2–2) || None || see 2nd game || 6–18
|- style="background:#bfb"
| 25 || May 10 (2) || @ Braves || 4–3 || Tommy Hughes (1–4) || Lefty Wallace (1–1) || None || 20,657 || 7–18
|- style="background:#fbb"
| 26 || May 11 || @ Braves || 2–3 || Tom Earley (3–1) || Johnny Podgajny (1–3) || None || 1,596 || 7–19
|- style="background:#bfb"
| 27 || May 12 || Cardinals || 3–2 || Lefty Hoerst (3–2) || Max Lanier (2–2) || None || 2,000 || 8–19
|- style="background:#fbb"
| 28 || May 13 || Cardinals || 1–9 || Lon Warneke (2–2) || Si Johnson (1–3) || None || 5,000 || 8–20
|- style="background:#fbb"
| 29 || May 14 || Cubs || 3–5 || Bill Lee (5–1) || Rube Melton (2–3) || None || 2,000 || 8–21
|- style="background:#fbb"
| 30 || May 15 || Cubs || 1–2 || Claude Passeau (4–3) || Tommy Hughes (1–5) || None || 1,500 || 8–22
|- style="background:#bbb"
| – || May 16 || Cubs || colspan=6 | Postponed (inclement weather); Makeup: June 25
|- style="background:#fbb"
| 31 || May 17 (1) || Pirates || 2–7 || Luke Hamlin (2–1) || Lefty Hoerst (3–3) || None || see 2nd game || 8–23
|- style="background:#bfb"
| 32 || May 17 (2) || Pirates || 5–4 (11) || Rube Melton (3–3) || Bob Klinger (2–1) || None || 10,079 || 9–23
|- style="background:#bfb"
| 33 || May 19 || Pirates || 5–4 || Johnny Podgajny (2–3) || Max Butcher (4–3) || Lefty Hoerst (1) || 3,366 || 10–23
|- style="background:#fbb"
| 34 || May 20 || Reds || 3–10 || Ray Starr (4–1) || Tommy Hughes (1–6) || None || 1,145 || 10–24
|- style="background:#bfb"
| 35 || May 21 || Reds || 3–2 || Si Johnson (2–3) || Paul Derringer (0–2) || None || 1,068 || 11–24
|- style="background:#fbb"
| 36 || May 22 || Braves || 7–10 || Lou Tost (3–2) || Earl Naylor (0–2) || Johnny Sain (2) || 4,007 || 11–25
|- style="background:#bfb"
| 37 || May 23 || Braves || 6–5 || Si Johnson (3–3) || Manny Salvo (1–2) || None || 1,663 || 12–25
|- style="background:#bfb"
| 38 || May 24 (1) || Braves || 3–2 (11) || Sam Nahem (1–0) || Jim Tobin (5–5) || None || see 2nd game || 13–25
|- style="background:#fbb"
| 39 || May 24 (2) || Braves || 3–6 || Dick Errickson (2–0) || Earl Naylor (0–3) || Johnny Sain (3) || 10,965 || 13–26
|- style="background:#fbb"
| 40 || May 25 || @ Dodgers || 0–3 || Curt Davis (6–1) || Lefty Hoerst (3–4) || None || 9,572 || 13–27
|- style="background:#fbb"
| 41 || May 27 || Giants || 2–6 || Bob Carpenter (4–2) || Si Johnson (3–4) || None || 5,110 || 13–28
|- style="background:#bfb"
| 42 || May 29 || @ Braves || 2–1 || Rube Melton (4–3) || Dick Errickson (2–1) || None || 2,078 || 14–28
|- style="background:#fbb"
| 43 || May 30 (1) || @ Braves || 1–10 || Lou Tost (5–2) || Johnny Podgajny (2–4) || None || see 2nd game || 14–29
|- style="background:#fbb"
| 44 || May 30 (2) || @ Braves || 3–4 || Johnny Hutchings (1–0) || Sam Nahem (1–1) || Johnny Sain (4) || 18,558 || 14–30
|- style="background:#fbb"
| 45 || May 31 (1) || @ Giants || 2–3 || Bill Lohrman (3–2) || Tommy Hughes (1–7) || None || see 2nd game || 14–31
|- style="background:#fbb"
| 46 || May 31 (2) || @ Giants || 1–7 || Bob Carpenter (5–2) || Lefty Hoerst (3–5) || None || 18,072 || 14–32
|-

|- style="background:#bfb"
| 47 || June 2 || @ Reds || 1–0 (10) || Si Johnson (4–4) || Elmer Riddle (1–6) || None || 1,486 || 15–32
|- style="background:#bfb"
| 48 || June 3 || @ Reds || 2–1 (10) || Rube Melton (5–3) || Paul Derringer (1–3) || None || 11,047 || 16–32
|- style="background:#fbb"
| 49 || June 5 || @ Pirates || 5–6 || Ken Heintzelman (4–5) || Lefty Hoerst (3–6) || Dutch Dietz (1) || 1,195 || 16–33
|- style="background:#fbb"
| 50 || June 6 || @ Pirates || 1–3 || Rip Sewell (5–5) || Tommy Hughes (1–8) || None || 2,184 || 16–34
|- style="background:#fbb"
| 51 || June 7 (1) || @ Pirates || 4–5 (10) || Ken Heintzelman (5–5) || Si Johnson (4–5) || None || see 2nd game || 16–35
|- style="background:#fbb"
| 52 || June 7 (2) || @ Pirates || 6–8 (7) || Johnny Lanning (2–2) || Rube Melton (5–4) || Lefty Wilkie (1) || 8,461 || 16–36
|- style="background:#fbb"
| 53 || June 10 || @ Cubs || 2–5 || Bill Lee (8–4) || Johnny Podgajny (2–5) || None || 4,837 || 16–37
|- style="background:#fbb"
| 54 || June 11 || @ Cubs || 1–7 || Claude Passeau (9–3) || Rube Melton (5–5) || None || 2,472 || 16–38
|- style="background:#fbb"
| 55 || June 12 || @ Cardinals || 1–2 || Mort Cooper (7–3) || Tommy Hughes (1–9) || None || 6,866 || 16–39
|- style="background:#bbb"
| – || June 13 (1) || @ Cardinals || colspan=6 | Postponed (inclement weather); Makeup: July 15 as a traditional double-header
|- style="background:#bbb"
| – || June 13 (2) || @ Cardinals || colspan=6 | Postponed (inclement weather); Makeup: August 28 as a traditional double-header
|- style="background:#fbb"
| 56 || June 14 (1) || @ Cardinals || 1–9 || Lon Warneke (5–2) || Si Johnson (4–6) || None || see 2nd game || 16–40
|- style="background:#fbb"
| 57 || June 14 (2) || @ Cardinals || 5–6 || Howie Krist (3–0) || Sam Nahem (1–2) || None || 10,367 || 16–41
|- style="background:#bfb"
| 58 || June 16 || Pirates || 5–1 || Johnny Podgajny (3–5) || Luke Hamlin (2–3) || None || 1,196 || 17–41
|- style="background:#fbb"
| 59 || June 17 || Pirates || 1–6 || Bob Klinger (4–1) || Lefty Hoerst (3–7) || None || 3,804 || 17–42
|- style="background:#fbb"
| 60 || June 19 || Reds || 4–6 || Bucky Walters (7–5) || Si Johnson (4–7) || Joe Beggs (2) || 6,074 || 17–43
|- style="background:#fbb"
| 61 || June 20 || Reds || 0–7 || Elmer Riddle (2–6) || Rube Melton (5–6) || None || 1,570 || 17–44
|- style="background:#bfb"
| 62 || June 21 (1) || Reds || 3–2 || Tommy Hughes (2–9) ||  || None || see 2nd game || 18–44
|- style="background:#fbb"
| 63 || June 21 (2) || Reds || 1–2 || Ray Starr (10–2) || Johnny Podgajny (3–6) || None || 8,114 || 18–45
|- style="background:#fbb"
| 64 || June 23 || Cubs || 4–8 || Vern Olsen (3–4) || Lefty Hoerst (3–8) || Bill Fleming (1) || 1,520 || 18–46
|- style="background:#fbb"
| 65 || June 24 || Cubs || 1–3 || Claude Passeau (11–4) || Earl Naylor (0–4) || None || 4,309 || 18–47
|- style="background:#fbb"
| 66 || June 25 || Cubs || 1–7 || Bill Lee (9–6) || Johnny Podgajny (3–7) || None || 1,184 || 18–48
|- style="background:#bbb"
| – || June 26 || Cardinals || colspan=6 | Postponed (inclement weather); Makeup: July 23
|- style="background:#bbb"
| – || June 27 || Cardinals || colspan=6 | Postponed (inclement weather); Makeup: September 14
|- style="background:#bfb"
| 67 || June 28 (1) || Cardinals || 2–1 (15) || Tommy Hughes (3–9) || Howie Krist (3–1) || None || see 2nd game || 19–48
|- style="background:#fbb"
| 68 || June 28 (2) || Cardinals || 1–3 || Lon Warneke (6–3) || Si Johnson (4–8) || None || 8,775 || 19–49
|- style="background:#fbb"
| 69 || June 29 || Dodgers || 3–10 || Ed Head (6–4) || Rube Melton (5–7) || Johnny Allen (3) || 8,066 || 19–50
|- style="background:#fbb"
| 70 || June 30 || @ Giants || 3–4 || Cliff Melton (10–5) || Johnny Podgajny (3–8) || None || 3,252 || 19–51
|-

|- style="background:#fbb"
| 71 || July 3 || Dodgers || 1–8 || Whit Wyatt (8–2) || Lefty Hoerst (3–9) || None || 1,646 || 19–52
|- style="background:#fbb"
| 72 || July 4 (1) || Dodgers || 0–14 || Kirby Higbe (8–4) || Earl Naylor (0–5) || None || see 2nd game || 19–53
|- style="background:#fbb"
| 73 || July 4 (2) || Dodgers || 4–5 || Johnny Allen (6–4) || Ike Pearson (0–2) || Hugh Casey (8) || 15,574 || 19–54
|- style="background:#bfb"
| 74 || July 5 (1) || Giants || 3–2 || Tommy Hughes (4–9) || Hal Schumacher (5–7) || None || see 2nd game || 20–54
|- style="background:#bfb"
| 75 || July 5 (2) || Giants || 5–3 || Si Johnson (5–8) || Tom Sunkel (2–3) || Rube Melton (1) || 8,539 || 21–54
|- style="background:#bbcaff;"
| – || July 6 ||colspan="7" | 1942 Major League Baseball All-Star Game at the Polo Grounds in New York
|- style="background:#fbb"
| 76 || July 9 || @ Pirates || 0–9 || Rip Sewell (9–7) || Rube Melton (5–8) || None || 29,488 || 21–55
|- style="background:#bbb"
| – || July 10 || @ Pirates || colspan=6 | Postponed (inclement weather); Makeup: September 3
|- style="background:#fbb"
| 77 || July 11 || @ Pirates || 5–12 || Lefty Wilkie (4–4) || Ike Pearson (0–3) || None || 2,034 || 21–56
|- style="background:#fbb"
| 78 || July 12 (1) || @ Reds || 0–2 ||  || Tommy Hughes (4–10) || None || see 2nd game || 21–57
|- style="background:#fbb"
| 79 || July 12 (2) || @ Reds || 1–2 || Elmer Riddle (3–6) || Si Johnson (5–9) || None || 9,185 || 21–58
|- style="background:#bbb"
| – || July 13 || @ Reds || colspan=6 | Postponed (inclement weather); Makeup: September 1
|- style="background:#bfb"
| 80 || July 14 || @ Reds || 2–1 || Rube Melton (6–8) || Ray Starr (12–5) || None || 1,375 || 22–58
|- style="background:#fbb"
| 81 || July 15 (1) || @ Cardinals || 3–7 || Johnny Beazley (10–4) || Lefty Hoerst (3–10) || None || see 2nd game || 22–59
|- style="background:#fbb"
| 82 || July 15 (2) || @ Cardinals || 4–9 || Murry Dickson (3–1) || Johnny Podgajny (3–9) || None || 10,602 || 22–60
|- style="background:#bfb"
| 83 || July 16 || @ Cardinals || 4–3 (10) || Tommy Hughes (5–10) || Whitey Moore (0–1) || None || 6,458 || 23–60
|- style="background:#fbb"
| 84 || July 17 || @ Cardinals || 1–10 || Howie Krist (6–1) || Si Johnson (5–10) || None || 785 || 23–61
|- style="background:#fbb"
| 85 || July 18 || @ Cubs || 1–2 || Bill Lee (10–9) || Rube Melton (6–9) || Bill Fleming (2) || 4,230 || 23–62
|- style="background:#bfb"
| 86 || July 19 (1) || @ Cubs || 8–5 || Johnny Podgajny (4–9) || Lon Warneke (6–6) || Tommy Hughes (1) || see 2nd game || 24–62
|- style="background:#fbb"
| 87 || July 19 (2) || @ Cubs || 4–8 || Hi Bithorn (5–6) || Boom-Boom Beck (0–1) || None || 16,682 || 24–63
|- style="background:#fbb"
| 88 || July 21 || Cardinals || 1–6 || Howie Krist (7–1) || Tommy Hughes (5–11) || None || 5,271 || 24–64
|- style="background:#fbb"
| 89 || July 22 || Cardinals || 0–7 || Johnny Beazley (11–4) || Si Johnson (5–11) || None || 2,290 || 24–65
|- style="background:#bfb"
| 90 || July 23 || Cardinals || 4–3 || Rube Melton (7–9) || Harry Gumbert (4–5) || None || 3,881 || 25–65
|- style="background:#bbb"
| – || July 24 || Cubs || colspan=6 | Postponed (inclement weather); Makeup: September 16 as a traditional double-header
|- style="background:#fbb"
| 91 || July 25 || Cubs || 1–4 || Lon Warneke (7–6) ||  || None || 4,513 || 25–66
|- style="background:#bfb"
| 92 || July 26 (1) || Cubs || 4–3 || Tommy Hughes (6–11) || Bill Lee (10–10) || None || see 2nd game || 26–66
|- style="background:#bfb"
| 93 || July 26 (2) || Cubs || 6–1 || Lefty Hoerst (4–10) || Claude Passeau (14–8) || None || 6,954 || 27–66
|- style="background:#bbb"
| – || July 27 || Reds || colspan=6 | Postponed (inclement weather); Makeup: July 28 as a traditional double-header
|- style="background:#fbb"
| 94 || July 28 (1) || Reds || 1–8 || Johnny Vander Meer (10–8) || Si Johnson (5–12) || None || see 2nd game || 27–67
|- style="background:#fbb"
| 95 || July 28 (2) || Reds || 1–3 || Ray Starr (13–7) || Rube Melton (7–10) || None || 2,789 || 27–68
|- style="background:#bbb"
| – || July 29 || Reds || colspan=6 | Postponed (inclement weather); Makeup: July 30
|- style="background:#bfb"
| 96 || July 30 || Reds || 4–2 || Ike Pearson (1–3) || Bucky Walters (12–8) || None || 4,141 || 28–68
|- style="background:#bbb"
| – || July 31 || Pirates || colspan=6 | Postponed (inclement weather); Makeup: September 9 as a traditional double-header
|-

|- style="background:#bfb"
| 97 || August 1 || Pirates || 2–1 (12) || Tommy Hughes (7–11) || Rip Sewell (11–9) || None || 1,595 || 29–68
|- style="background:#fbb"
| 98 || August 2 (1) || Pirates || 2–4 || Luke Hamlin (3–4) || Rube Melton (7–11) || None || see 2nd game || 29–69
|- style="background:#fbb"
| 99 || August 2 (2) || Pirates || 2–3 || Dutch Dietz (4–4) || Lefty Hoerst (4–11) || Max Butcher (1) || 7,794 || 29–70
|- style="background:#bfb"
| 100 || August 4 || Braves || 4–2 || Si Johnson (6–12) || Jim Tobin (9–15) || None || 3,020 || 30–70
|- style="background:#bfb"
| 101 || August 5 || Braves || 5–2 || Tommy Hughes (8–11) || Tom Earley (4–9) || None || 3,294 || 31–70
|- style="background:#fbb"
| 102 || August 7 || Giants || 4–6 || Carl Hubbell (7–6) || Rube Melton (7–12) || Ace Adams (7) || 8,500 || 31–71
|- style="background:#bbb"
| – || August 8 || Giants || colspan=6 | Postponed (inclement weather); Makeup: September 8
|- style="background:#fbb"
| 103 || August 9 (1) || Giants || 2–3 (10) || Bill Lohrman (10–4) || Johnny Podgajny (4–11) || None || see 2nd game || 31–72
|- style="background:#fbb"
| 104 || August 9 (2) || Giants || 0–2 || Bill McGee (4–2) || Tommy Hughes (8–12) || None || 3,081 || 31–73
|- style="background:#fbb"
| 105 || August 10 || @ Dodgers || 0–6 || Kirby Higbe (11–8) || Lefty Hoerst (4–12) || None || 16,780 || 31–74
|- style="background:#fbb"
| 106 || August 12 || @ Dodgers || 0–1 || Larry French (12–1) || Rube Melton (7–13) || None || 3,661 || 31–75
|- style="background:#fbb"
| 107 || August 14 || @ Giants || 2–5 || Carl Hubbell (8–6) || Si Johnson (6–13) || None || 1,674 || 31–76
|- style="background:#fbb"
| 108 || August 15 (1) || @ Giants || 3–5 || Ace Adams (4–3) || Tommy Hughes (8–13) || None || see 2nd game || 31–77
|- style="background:#fbb"
| 109 || August 15 (2) || @ Giants || 3–4 (10) || Harry Feldman (3–1) ||  || None || 9,816 || 31–78
|- style="background:#fbb"
| 110 || August 16 (1) || @ Giants || 5–6 || Harry Feldman (4–1) || Lefty Hoerst (4–13) || None || 14,955 || 31–79
|- style="background:#bbb"
| – || August 16 (2) || @ Giants || colspan=6 | Postponed (inclement weather, rain); Makeup: September 24 as a traditional double-header
|- style="background:#bfb"
| 111 || August 18 || Dodgers || 3–1 || Rube Melton (8–13) || Max Macon (3–1) || None || 7,560 || 32–79
|- style="background:#fbb"
| 112 ||  || @ Braves || 1–2 (10) || Jim Tobin (10–17) || Tommy Hughes (8–14) || None || see 2nd game || 32–80
|- style="background:#bfb"
| 113 || August 22 (2) || @ Braves || 5–3 || Si Johnson (7–13) || Johnny Sain (4–6) || None || 2,747 || 33–80
|- style="background:#fbb"
| 114 || August 23 (1) || @ Braves || 1–3 || Al Javery (11–13) || Lefty Hoerst (4–14) || None || see 2nd game || 33–81
|- style="background:#bfb"
| 115 || August 23 (2) || @ Braves || 2–0 || Rube Melton (9–13) || Manny Salvo (6–6) || None || 6,511 || 34–81
|- style="background:#bfb"
| 116 || August 25 || @ Cubs || 6–4 ||  || Bill Lee (13–12) || Rube Melton (2) || 2,541 || 35–81
|- style="background:#bfb"
| 117 || August 26 (1) || @ Cubs || 3–2 (11) || Tommy Hughes (9–14) || Hi Bithorn (7–11) || Rube Melton (3) || see 2nd game || 36–81
|- style="background:#fbb"
| 118 || August 26 (2) || @ Cubs || 0–3 || Bill Fleming (4–5) || Si Johnson (7–14) || None || 7,784 || 36–82
|- style="background:#fbb"
| 119 || August 28 (1) || @ Cardinals || 4–7 || Harry Gumbert (7–5) || Sam Nahem (1–3) || None || see 2nd game || 36–83
|- style="background:#fbb"
| 120 || August 28 (2) || @ Cardinals || 5–7 || Howie Krist (11–3) || Rube Melton (9–14) || Ernie White (2) || 1,914 || 36–84
|- style="background:#fbb"
| 121 || August 29 || @ Cardinals || 2–5 || Mort Cooper (17–7) || Ike Pearson (1–4) || None || 1,865 || 36–85
|- style="background:#fbb"
| 122 || August 30 (1) || @ Reds || 0–2 || Johnny Vander Meer (16–9) || Tommy Hughes (9–15) || None || see 2nd game || 36–86
|- style="background:#fbb"
| 123 || August 30 (2) || @ Reds || 5–8 || Ray Starr (14–12) || Johnny Podgajny (5–13) || Joe Beggs (8) || 6,437 || 36–87
|- style="background:#fbb"
| 124 || August 31 || @ Reds || 1–8 || Elmer Riddle (6–9) || Rube Melton (9–15) || None || 4,108 || 36–88
|-

|- style="background:#fbb"
| 125 || September 1 || @ Reds || 3–4 (11) || Joe Beggs (5–4) || Si Johnson (7–15) || None || 1,030 || 36–89
|- style="background:#fbb"
| 126 || September 2 || @ Pirates || 2–5 || Dutch Dietz (6–6) || Lefty Hoerst (4–15) || None || 3,712 || 36–90
|- style="background:#bbb"
| – || September 3 || @ Pirates || colspan=6 | Postponed (inclement weather); Makeup: September 10 as a traditional double-header in Philadelphia
|- style="background:#fbb"
| 127 ||  || Braves || 3–13 || Tom Earley (5–11) || Si Johnson (7–16) || None || see 2nd game || 36–91
|- style="background:#fbb"
| 128 || September 6 (2) || Braves || 3–7 || Manny Salvo (7–7) || Lefty Hoerst (4–16) || None || 5,738 || 36–92
|- style="background:#fbb"
| 129 || September 7 (1) || Giants || 3–5 || Bill Lohrman (13–4) || Tommy Hughes (9–16) || None || see 2nd game || 36–93
|- style="background:#fbb"
| 130 || September 7 (2) || Giants || 0–4 || Bob Carpenter (10–9) || Rube Melton (9–16) || None || 5,290 || 36–94
|- style="background:#bbb"
| – || September 8 || Giants || colspan=6 | Postponed (inclement weather); Makeup: September 25 as a traditional double-header in New York
|- style="background:#bbb"
| – || September 9 (1) || Pirates || colspan=6 | Cancelled (inclement weather); Was not rescheduled
|- style="background:#bbb"
| – || September 9 (2) || Pirates || colspan=6 | Cancelled (inclement weather); Was not rescheduled
|- style="background:#bfb"
| 131 || September 10 (1) || Pirates || 2–1 (11) ||  || Dutch Dietz (6–8) || None ||  || 37–94
|- style="background:#bbb"
| – || September 10 (2) || Pirates || colspan=6 | Cancelled (inclement weather); Was not rescheduled
|- style="background:#fbb"
| 132 || September 11 || Reds || 5–8 (11) || Joe Beggs (6–4) || Rube Melton (9–17) || None || 393 || 37–95
|- style="background:#fbb"
| 133 || September 12 || Reds || 1–4 || Elmer Riddle (7–10) || Andy Lapihuska (0–1) || None || 1,017 || 37–96
|- style="background:#bfb"
| 134 || September 13 (1) || Cardinals || 2–1 || Tommy Hughes (11–16) || Johnny Beazley (19–6) || None || see 2nd game || 38–96
|- style="background:#fbb"
| 135 || September 13 (2) || Cardinals || 2–3 || Bill Beckmann (1–1) || Rube Melton (9–18) || None || 20,798 || 38–97
|- style="background:#fbb"
| 136 || September 14 || Cardinals || 3–6 || Howie Krist (13–3) ||  || None || 2,550 || 38–98
|- style="background:#fbb"
| 137 || September 15 || Cardinals || 2–3 (14) || Murry Dickson (6–3) || Si Johnson (7–17) || None || 3,526 || 38–99
|- style="background:#bfb"
| 138 || September 16 (1) || Cubs || 3–1 || Johnny Podgajny (6–14) || Claude Passeau (18–13) || None || see 2nd game || 39–99
|- style="background:#fbb"
| 139 || September 16 (2) || Cubs || 1–4 || Hi Bithorn (9–14) || George Hennessey (0–1) || None || 1,287 || 39–100
|- style="background:#fbb"
| 140 || September 17 || Cubs || 0–8 || Hank Wyse (2–0) || Andy Lapihuska (0–2) || None || 1,500 || 39–101
|- style="background:#bbb"
| – || September 18 || @ Dodgers || colspan=6 | Postponed (inclement weather); Makeup: September 21
|- style="background:#fbb"
| 141 || September 19 || @ Dodgers || 4–5 (11) || Hugh Casey (6–3) || Si Johnson (7–18) || None || 7,254 || 39–102
|- style="background:#bfb"
| 142 || September 20 (1) || @ Dodgers || 7–3 || Tommy Hughes (12–16) || Whit Wyatt (18–7) || Rube Melton (4) || see 2nd game || 40–102
|- style="background:#fbb"
| 143 || September 20 (2) || @ Dodgers || 2–4 || Bobo Newsom (13–19) || Ike Pearson (1–5) || None || 15,666 || 40–103
|- style="background:#fbb"
| 144 || September 21 || @ Dodgers || 1–3 || Kirby Higbe (15–11) || Si Johnson (7–19) || None || 15,361 || 40–104
|- style="background:#fbb"
| 145 || September 23 || @ Dodgers || 0–6 || Larry French (14–4) || Rube Melton (9–19) || None || 4,047 || 40–105
|- style="background:#fbb"
| 146 || September 24 (1) || @ Giants || 0–8 || Bill Lohrman (14–5) || Tommy Hughes (12–17) || None || see 2nd game || 40–106
|- style="background:#bfb"
| 147 || September 24 (2) || @ Giants || 3–2 || George Hennessey (1–1) || Bill Voiselle (0–1) || None || 3,066 || 41–106
|- style="background:#fbb"
| 148 || September 25 (1) || @ Giants || 3–6 || Hal Schumacher (12–13) || Ike Pearson (1–6) || None || see 2nd game || 41–107
|- style="background:#bfb"
| 149 || September 25 (2) || @ Giants || 9–1 || Si Johnson (8–19) || Hank Leiber (0–1) || None || 1,674 || 42–107
|- style="background:#fbb"
| 150 || September 26 || Dodgers || 3–8 || Larry French (15–4) || Rube Melton (9–20) || Hugh Casey (13) || 2,874 || 42–108
|- style="background:#fbb"
| 151 || September 27 || Dodgers || 3–4 || Kirby Higbe (16–11) || Tommy Hughes (12–18) || Les Webber (1) || 4,650 || 42–109
|-

| style="text-align:left;" |
The original schedule indicated single games on May 10 and August 21 at Boston; which became a double-header on May 10.
The second game of a scheduled double-header on June 7, 1942, ended after seven innings due to the Pennsylvania Sunday curfew law with the score 6–8.
The July 3, 1942, game was protested by the Phillies in the top of the fifth inning. The protest was later denied.
The original schedule indicated single games on August 22 and 23 and September 21 and 22 at Boston; which became double-headers on August 22 and 23.
The original schedule indicated single games on August 26 and 27 at Chicago; which became a double-header on August 26.
The original schedule indicated single games on September 5 and 6 with Boston; which became a double-header on September 6.

Roster

Player stats

Batting

Starters by position 
Note: Pos = Position; G = Games played; AB = At bats; H = Hits; Avg. = Batting average; HR = Home runs; RBI = Runs batted in

Other batters 
Note: G = Games played; AB = At bats; H = Hits; Avg. = Batting average; HR = Home runs; RBI = Runs batted in

Pitching

Starting pitchers 
Note: G = Games pitched; IP = Innings pitched; W = Wins; L = Losses; ERA = Earned run average; SO = Strikeouts

Other pitchers 
Note: G = Games pitched; IP = Innings pitched; W = Wins; L = Losses; ERA = Earned run average; SO = Strikeouts

Relief pitchers 
Note: G = Games pitched; W = Wins; L = Losses; SV = Saves; ERA = Earned run average; SO = Strikeouts

Farm system

See also
List of worst Major League Baseball season records

Notes

References 
1942 Philadelphia Phillies season at Baseball Reference

Philadelphia Phillies seasons
Philadelphia Phillies season
Philadelphia